Larks' Tongues in Aspic is the second of the major box set releases from English progressive rock group King Crimson, released in 2012 by Discipline Global Mobile & Panegyric Records. The set is devoted to all existing recordings associated with the 1973 album Larks' Tongues In Aspic.

Over 13 CDs, 1 DVD, 1 Blu-ray, copious sleeve notes and replica memorabilia, Larks' Tongues in Aspic box covers the short lived five-piece King Crimson when the band shifted markedly in musical styles relative to their earlier work. Included is a 36-page booklet with photos, timeline/expanded diary, timeline, transcript of extensive interview of bandleader Robert Fripp conducted by David Singleton (July 2012), new essays by King Crimson historian Sid Smith and set compiler Declan Colgan.
 
Also included are prints of the original album sleeve, individual band member postcards, reproduction of UK tour handbill and reproduction of Rainbow Theatre London concert ticket stub.

This CD, DVD-A and Blu-ray set includes every available recording of the short-lived 5 man line-up, through live performances and studio sessions. As with the rest of the 40th Anniversary Series, the release features new stereo and 5.1 surround mixes produced by Steven Wilson and Fripp, taken from the original multi-track master tapes, as well as a selection of alternative versions. Clean video footage of the band performing early versions of "Exiles", "Larks' Tongues in Aspic (Part I)" and a 30-minute improvisation became available publicly for the first time as part of this reissue; previously only one of the pieces had been broadcast on German television, with heavy visual effects applied to the image.

In addition, all known concert-recordings with this line-up are enclosed. Some of them were previously released through the King Crimson Collectors Club. There are two new recordings; one is from Glasgow, and was delivered from Ole Petter Dronen and the other one is percussionist Jamie Muir's penultimate gig with the band in Portsmouth, without credited source. The box also contains a link to a free download of a London-gig whose extremely poor audio quality renders it barely listenable; its internet-only release is meant for completists only.

Reception

More measured than the reaction to original album of the title, there has nevertheless been a positive response to the deluxe box set's appearance. Sean Westergaard at AllMusic giving the set a solid 4of5 rating said "There's even amazing footage of the band live on German TV that captures what a manic performer Jamie Muir could be" when describing this collection of the quintet's output. He also commented that it "is clearly not a set for the casual fan" then goes on the counter with "but it fills a need for the serious King Crimson aficionado".
ProgArchive on the other hand referred to it as an "excellent addition to any prog rock music collection.

John Kelman of allaboutjazz was even more complementary regarding both King Crimson and this particular set when he suggested that "the opportunity to hear all this wonderful music, appreciate Larks' Tongues in Aspic for the landmark recording it is, and get the chance to really understand and appreciate how key Jamie Muir" were the defining ways to view this set.

Track listing

Personnel
 Robert Fripp - guitar, Mellotron, devices
 John Wetton- vocals, bass guitar, piano
 Bill Bruford - drums, percussion
 David Cross - violin, viola, Mellotron, electric piano, flute
 Jamie Muir - percussion, drums, allsorts

References

External links 

 

King Crimson albums
2012 albums
Discipline Global Mobile albums